Wayne Yetman (born 8 October 1946) is a Canadian long-distance runner. He competed in the marathon at the 1976 Summer Olympics.

References

1946 births
Living people
Athletes (track and field) at the 1976 Summer Olympics
Canadian male long-distance runners
Canadian male marathon runners
Olympic track and field athletes of Canada
Athletes from Toronto